Régis Kittler (born 6 October 1979 in Mulhouse) is a French football player who currently plays for French club AS Illzach Modenheim in the Championnat de France amateur 2. He serves as captain of the club and plays as a defensive midfielder. Kittler joined his current club in 2005 while the club was playing in the Championnat de France amateur 2. He began his career with hometown club FC Mulhouse and played one season with the club before having short stints with professional clubs Le Havre and Clermont Foot. Kittler returned to Mulhouse in 2001 and spent four seasons with the club before signing with Colmar.

References

External links
 

1979 births
Living people
French footballers
Footballers from Mulhouse
SR Colmar players
Clermont Foot players
FC Mulhouse players
Le Havre AC players
AS Illzach Modenheim players
Association football midfielders